The Cobangbang Ancestral House is a heritage house in Manila, Philippines built in 1930 by Aurelio Cobangbang. It is located within the heritage zone of Santa Ana, the only district in Manila which was spared from destruction during World War II.

Architecture

The two-storey ancestral house has a mezzanine (entresuelo) on the ground floor. Board panels at the facade of the house were arranged horizontally, while the walls on the lateral part was made of reinforced concrete. Galvanized iron sheets were utilized as main roof and canopies, and eaves have cut-and-pierced metal coffers. Soffits were pierced for ventilation and add a decorative function.

The entrance to the mezzanine is in the right lateral part of the house, at the side of the garage. An antique bed made from Narra tree as well as cabinets made of hardwood can be found inside.

Terrazzo stairs lead to the second level porch. Three steps of the stairs have been buried over time due to road elevation.

The porch has two wooden framed glass swing-out windows facing the street and another at the lateral side. Glass transoms were installed above the windows while metal grills are attached to the walls underneath each window. Ornamental brackets are noticeable on posts at the entrance to the second floor.

Original machuca tiles are laid on the second floor. More antique furnitures and furnishings can be found. One of the most remarkable furniture found inside is the round dining table - made from the root of a Narra tree, and was built the same time the ancestral house was constructed.

Aside from the traditional capiz windows at the left lateral portion of the house, rare patterned glass windows are also displayed. A tracery transom sets the dining area apart from the receiving area.
 
Since its construction in 1930, no renovations have been made to the house, according to Dr. Amelia Cobangbang, the daughter of Engr. Aurelio Cobangbang.

Gallery

See also 
 Historic houses in Santa Ana, Manila

References

Sources

 

 

 

Houses completed in 1930
Philippine Cultural Heritage sites
Houses in Metro Manila
Buildings and structures in Santa Ana, Manila
20th-century architecture in the Philippines